Hibberdiales is an order of Chrysophyceae (golden algae).

It includes Chromophyton, Hibberdia, and Lagynion.

References

Algae orders
Heterokont orders
Chrysophyceae